Book of Southern Tang (南唐書; Nantang Shu) could refer to one of three ancient Chinese historiography books on the history of Southern Tang (937–975):
 Ma's Book of Southern Tang (1105) by Ma Ling
 Lu's Book of Southern Tang (1184) by Lu You
 Hu's Book of Southern Tang by Hu Hui (胡恢), mentioned in a 1701 book but no longer extant

See also
 Book of Tang (disambiguation)